Eavor Technologies Inc. (pronounced “ev-er”) is a global geothermal technology company headquartered in Calgary, Alberta. The firm was founded in 2017 with the goal of producing a scalable form of baseload, dispatchable energy.

Technology

Eavor-Loop 
Eavor-Loop is a closed-loop geothermal energy extraction system. It is a buried well system consisting of two vertical wells several kilometers deep connected by an extended system of interconnected multilaterals. Multilaterals are drilled connecting the vertical wells, parallel to each other.  The multilaterals are not cased with steel, but rather a polymer in the drilling mud is used to seal the inside of the pipe from the surrounding rock. This is done to increase heat extraction efficiency in the horizontal plane by exposing the system to a larger volume of rock.  A benign working fluid is circulated within the completely contained system, which harvests heat from within the earth and brings it to the surface where it can be used for commercial heating applications or electricity generation. Circulation is added by the thermosiphon effect, where temperature differences between the upflowing and downflowing working fluid cause the system to circulate without pumps.

Environmental impact 
The key feature of the firm's  geothermal technology is the closed-loop nature of the system. This mitigates many of the risks associated with traditional geothermal technologies, which use wells to produce brine from subsurface aquifers. As a closed-loop system that operates in complete isolation from the surrounding environment, the system requires no fracking, produces no greenhouse gas emissions, poses no earthquake or subsidence risk, no water use, produces no brine or solids, and no aquifer contamination.

Facilities 
The Eavor-Lite Demonstration Project is a full-scale prototype of the firm's technology suite located near Rocky Mountain House, Alberta. Construction began in August 2019 and was completed in February 2020. The system consists of two vertical wells connected toe to toe, with one multilateral well drilled off the horizontal section, parallel to the original well.  The project was not intended to be commercially viable, but was designed to demonstrate critical elements of the technology at the lowest cost. The firm announced the official completion and third party validation of the project on February 5, 2020.

Projects

Eavor Yukon 
In January 2020, Eavor Yukon announced a partnership with Carmacks Development Corporation (CDC), owned by the Little Salmon Carmacks First Nation, to establish Eavor-Loop technology in the Yukon

In May 2020, Eavor Technologies entered into a letter of intent with Enex Power Germany GmbH to form a geothermal project development company to construct Eavor-Loop heat and power projects within Enex’s existing geothermal license area in Bavaria, Germany. Under German EEG law the project will be subsidised by a fixed power price of €227/MWh (approx. CAD $344/MWh) until 2042 (assuming it's commissioned in 2022). 

In May 2020, the firm announced the launch of second generation technology featuring a new demonstration site, Eavor-Long, in locations across Canada, France, Norway and the United States.

Other Projects 
In 2022, Eavor announced plans for projects across Europe and North America.

References

External links 
 

Renewable energy technology companies
Geothermal energy in Canada
Companies based in Calgary
Canadian companies established in 2017